The Frank Stewart House, also known as the Marian Stewart Bailey House, is a historic building located in Washington, Iowa, United States. Frank Stewart was a successful eastern Iowa businessman who was also involved in community affairs. Among other responsibilities, he served as a Park Commissioner in Washington. His only child, Marian Stewart Bailey, also held that position. The house is a two-story, frame, Queen Anne with an asymmetrical design. The structure follows a simple cross-gable plan, but the facade projection is offset. Both gables of the main facade feature decorative millwork of diagonal patterns. There is also a wrap-around porch on the main floor with several porches on the second floor. The house was individually listed on the National Register of Historic Places in 1987. In 2018 it was included as a contributing property in the West Side Residential Historic District.

References

Houses completed in 1894
Houses in Washington County, Iowa
Washington, Iowa
Queen Anne architecture in Iowa
National Register of Historic Places in Washington County, Iowa
Houses on the National Register of Historic Places in Iowa
Individually listed contributing properties to historic districts on the National Register in Iowa